The English language uses many Greek and Latin roots, stems, and prefixes. These roots are listed alphabetically on three pages:
 Greek and Latin roots from A to G
 Greek and Latin roots from H to O
 Greek and Latin roots from P to Z.

Some of those used in medicine and medical technology are listed in the List of medical roots, suffixes and prefixes.

See also 

 Classical compound
 English words of Greek origin
 English prefixes
 Greek language
 Hybrid word
 Interlingua
 International scientific vocabulary
 Latin
 Latin influence in English
 Lexicon Mediae et Infimae Latinitatis Polonorum
 List of Greek phrases
 List of Latin abbreviations
 List of Latin and Greek words commonly used in systematic names
 List of Latin legal terms
 List of Latin phrases
 List of Latin words with English derivatives
 List of Latinised names
 Romanization (cultural)
 Help:IPA/Latin

External links 
 List of Latin Derivatives
 Index of Latin and Greek Roots from the University of Alberta

Greek language
Latin language
Root (linguistics)